Ectemnia invenusta, the unattractive black fly, is a species of black flies in the family Simuliidae.

References

Simuliidae
Articles created by Qbugbot
Insects described in 1848